Elections to Runnymede Council were held on 6 May 1999.  One third of the council was up for election and the Conservative party stayed in overall control of the council.

After the election, the composition of the council was
Conservative 25
Labour 9
Independent 6
Liberal Democrat 2

Election result

Ward results

References
1999 Runnymede election result
Ward results

1999
1999 English local elections
1990s in Surrey